The Samdŭng T'an'gwang Line, or Samdŭng Colliery Line is a former non-electrified railway line of the Korean State Railway in Kangdong County, P'yŏngyang, North Korea, which ran from Samdŭng on the P'yŏngdŏk Line to Taeri.

Route 

A yellow background in the "Distance" box indicates that section of the line is not electrified.

References

Railway lines in North Korea
Standard gauge railways in North Korea